The 3rd constituency of Marne (French: Troisième circonscription de la Marne) is one of five electoral districts in the department of the same name, each of which returns one deputy to the French National Assembly in elections using the two-round system, with a run-off if no candidate receives more than 50% of the vote in the first round.

Description
The constituency is made up of the six former cantons of Beine-Nauroy, Bourgogne, Reims-4, Reims-8, Reims-10, and Suippes.

It covers most of the western edge of the department, plus an area to the south of Reims. Its largest town is Épernay. Today's 3rd constituency bears no resemblance to the one of the same name which existed prior to the 2012 election; instead it covers most of the area of the now abolished 6th constituency.

At the time of the 1999 census (which was the basis for the most recent redrawing of constituency boundaries, carried out in 2010) the constituency had a total population of 96,350.

Despite the above-mentioned boundary changes, the area has remained consistently conservative in its voting habits, returning Philippe-Armand Martin (who had previously represented the 6th constituency) at the 2012 election. Martin did not run in the 2017 election and the seat was won by Éric Girardin of La République En Marche!.

Historic representation

Election results

2022

2017

2012

 
 
 
 
 
 
 
|-
| colspan="8" bgcolor="#E9E9E9"|
|-

Sources
Official results of French elections from 2002: "Résultats électoraux officiels en France" (in French).

Official results of French elections from 2017: "" (in French).

3